Melty may refer to:

Melty, a character in Sega's role-playing video game Shining Hearts

See also
Melting, the process of transitioning from a solid to a liquid
Translational drift, a form of locomotion also known as "melty brain"
"Melty Tale Storage" a song by Minori Chihara
"Melty Love", Melty Case and 10th Melty Life, a single and two albums, respectively, by Shazna

Melt (disambiguation)